The Extraliga (also DHL Extraliga for sponsorship reasons) is the top tier national rugby union competition in Hungary. There is promotion and relegation involved between the Extraliga and the next level down, Nemzeti Bajnokság I (First Division).

Format and structure
Six teams take part. Each team plays every other team twice, in other words, both home and away.

Current teams
2011-12 season

See also
Rugby union in Hungary

References

Rugby union leagues in Europe
   
Rugby union leagues in Romania
Hungary
Professional sports leagues in Hungary
Professional sports leagues in Romania